Thomas Bourhill Johnston (18 August 1927 – 4 September 2008) was a Scottish professional footballer who scored 256 goals from 425 appearances in the Scottish and English Football Leagues.

Johnston was the Football League Second Division top scorer for the 1957–58 season with 43 goals for Leyton Orient and Blackburn Rovers. He was Orient's all-time top scorer and in 1999 was voted their greatest player of all time.

He had a withered arm, a legacy of an injury received while he was a miner, and always played with this arm bandaged. Johnston and his family emigrated to Australia in 1972, and he died in Shoalhaven, New South Wales, on 4 September 2008.

The south stand at Orient's Brisbane Road ground was named the Tommy Johnston Stand in his honour, and his ashes were interred there.

See also
List of footballers in England by number of league goals (200+)

References

1927 births
2008 deaths
People from Loanhead
Sportspeople from Midlothian
Scottish footballers
Association football forwards
Kilmarnock F.C. players
Darlington F.C. players
Oldham Athletic A.F.C. players
Norwich City F.C. players
Newport County A.F.C. players
Leyton Orient F.C. players
Blackburn Rovers F.C. players
Gillingham F.C. players
Scottish Football League players
English Football League players
Sportsmen with disabilities
Scottish emigrants to Australia